Markt may refer to:

 Aktueller Software Markt
 Christkindl Markt
 Media Markt
 Rahela Markt

Places in Germany 

 Markt Berolzheim
 Markt Bibart
 Markt Einersheim
 Markt Erlbach
 Markt Indersdorf
 Markt Nordheim
 Markt Rettenbach
 Markt Schwaben
 Markt Simbach
 Markt Taschendorf
 Markt Wald
 Hackescher Markt
 Stetten am kalten Markt
 Wiener Markt

Places in Austria 

 Markt Allhau
 Markt Hartmannsdorf
 Markt Neuhodis
 Markt Piesting
 Markt Sankt Martin
 Aschbach-Markt
 Aspang-Markt

Other places 

 Markt (Bruges)
 Markt (Rosmalen)
 Markt Eisenstein

See also 

 Grote Markt (disambiguation)
 Markt station (disambiguation)
 Mark (disambiguation)
 Market (disambiguation)